Galina Beloglazova (born June 10, 1967 Astrakhan, Soviet Union) is a Soviet individual rhythmic gymnast. She was the 1983 World All-around silver medalist and the 1984 European All-around champion.

Career 
Beloglazova began training at just 5 years old under Ludmila Tichomirova, who would coach the talented gymnast throughout her career. she emerged onto the scene on the international stage at the traditional Intervision Cup in Cottbus GDR, 1980 where as a junior, she took the 1st place. As a senior, she was chosen as the alternate to the Soviet team at the 1982 European Championships, but her performance in practice so impressed her coaches that they put the 15-year-old in the competition lineup. She wound up 7th in the all-around and qualified to two event finals. Beloglazova would soon be among the leading Soviet gymnasts of the 1980s along with Marina Lobatch, Tatiana Druchinina, and Dalia Kutkaitė.

In 1983, Beloglazova gave the Bulgarian team an upset by nearly winning the 1983 World Championship title. If not for a drop on the very last note of her clubs exercise, Beloglazova would have defeated Bulgarian gymnast Diliana Guerguieva. Instead she tied for silver and won three more medals in apparatus finals (gold with ball and ribbon and silver with hoop). Most impressively, she counted four perfect 10s in the event competition.

At the 1984 Europeans, Beloglazova won the all-around gold medal. She also won medals on each of the 4 apparatus, gold with ribbon, silver with ball, and bronze with hoop and clubs. Her performance at the  1986 Europeans also earned her the all-around bronze medal, as well as a pair of golds for ribbon and ball and a bronze for clubs in the event finals.

Beloglazova would perform in her last major competition, at the 1986 Goodwill Games. She finished 3rd all-around, 2nd with clubs, and 1st with ball. She also won the prize for the title of "Miss Goodwill Games."

Personal life 
Beloglazova was formerly married to Estonian basketball player Heino Enden, with whom she has a son Anthony Enden (born 1987). Beloglazova has degrees in English and German languages.V. Atkinson.

Beloglazova is remarried and has been living in the United States since October 2012.

References

 Catalano, Robin. Gymnastics Greats , Galina Beloglazova (URS), October 29, 1999.

External links
 

Soviet rhythmic gymnasts
Russian rhythmic gymnasts
1967 births
Living people
Medalists at the Rhythmic Gymnastics World Championships
Goodwill Games medalists in gymnastics
Competitors at the 1986 Goodwill Games
Sportspeople from Astrakhan